= Oyun river =

River in Kwara State, Nigeria

The Oyun River (Yoruba: Odò Òyun) is a river in Ilorin area in Kwara State, Nigeria. River Oyun flows from southeast to southwest.
